Orazio Ludovisi (1561–1624) was an Italian nobleman, military commander and patrician of Bologna. During his brother's reign as Pope Gregory XV, he became Commander of the Papal Armies and Duke of Fiano and Zagarolo.

Early life

Ludovisi was born in 1561, son of Pompeo Ludovisi, a patrician of Bologna, and his wife Camillia Bianchini. He was the older brother of Cardinal Alessandro Ludovisi.

He married Lavinia Albergati and the two had a number of children including:
 
Niccolò Ludovisi who inherited his titles
Ludovico Ludovisi who was made Cardinal by Pope Gregory XV
Ippolita Ludovisi who married and was mother of Olimpia Aldobrandini.

Papacy of Gregory XV

In February 1621 Ludovisi's brother, Alessandro Ludovisi, was elected to the papal throne as Pope Gregory XV. A month later, on 13 March 1621, Ludovisi moved to Rome and was immediately appointed Commander of the Papal Armies by his brother. Setting a precedent for his successor (Pope Urban VIII, who would later make habit commonplace), the Pope also purchased the comune of Fiano from the House of Sforza for 200,000 Écu and Ludovisi was duly appointed Duke of Fiano and also Duke of Zagarolo.

During his brother's reign, Ludovisi and his wife were patrons of the Bolognese painter Giovanni Valesio.

References

1561 births
1640 deaths
Dukes of Italy
Nobility from Bologna
Military personnel from Bologna